Even If and Especially When is the second studio album by the Seattle band Screaming Trees, released in 1987. It was their first album released on SST.

Critical reception
The Encyclopedia of Popular Music called Even If and Especially When "the best of three strong albums for SST." Trouser Press wrote: "Dropping the baby fat (well, some of it) without compromising the trademark garagey roar, the band hit on a sound it would gradually refine on each successive release."

Track listing

Personnel 
 Screaming Trees
 Mark Lanegan – vocals
 Gary Lee Conner – guitar, backing vocals, electric organ
 Van Conner – bass, backing vocals
 Mark Pickerel – percussion, drums

 Additional personnel
 Rod Doak – backing vocals on "Cold Rain"
 Steve Fisk – producer
 Diane Szukovathy – cover design

References

Screaming Trees albums
1987 albums
SST Records albums
Albums produced by Steve Fisk